Paul Makin (born 18 December 1947, Marrickville, New South Wales) is a South Australia based television and radio journalist. He started as a cadet journalist at Radio 5KA Adelaide in 1973 joined Radio 2UE Sydney in 1976 before moving to television; he is currently a freelance presenter for Channel 7 Adelaide.

Personal life
Makin was born in Marrickville, Sydney on 18 December 1947, the only child of William and Poppy Makin.  He grew up in the south-western Sydney suburb of Panania where he started his schooling at Panania North Public School and later attended Kingsgrove De La Salle.

Makin has been married once and has two children, Rebecca and Paul. He has been with his current partner Marion Blackham since 1999.

Career history
Makin has been in the media for over 40 years, he began his career as a Cine-Cameraman in 1963 and worked with ATN Channel 7 Sydney, NWS Channel 9 Adelaide, SAS Channel 10 Adelaide, WIN Channel 4 Wollongong, as a stringer with ABC Sydney and TCN Channel 9 Sydney.

He joined Radio 5KA Adelaide in 1973 to take up a journalism cadetship and in 1976 joined Radio 2UE Sydney as a radio journalist and on-road reporter whilst also presenting the Night-watch program.  He was the first newsman on the scene of the Granville train disaster.

From 1977 to 1980 he was the on-air reporter for Willesee at 7 and presented the show in the absence of Mike Willesee.

Makin moved to Melbourne in 1980 as news reporter and presenter for Newsbeat on Radio 3UZ and was stationed in Newport Rhode Island to cover the America’s Cup. During this time he hosted the national game show $50,000 Letterbox out of Perth.

In 1984 he joined Channel 10 Adelaide (previously ADS Channel 7) as a senior reporter and hosted Makin’s Adelaide, State Affair and Great Mysteries of the World from the news desk. During this time he became entertainment reporter and senior reporter for This Week and a regular contributor to Bert Newton’s Good Morning Australia. In 1999 Makin left the media to travel overseas.

Makin returned to the media in 2000 to take up the senior reporter’s role with Today Tonight Channel 7 Adelaide and fill-in executive producer whilst he was on leave. During this time he hosted various radio shifts with Radio 5AA Adelaide through the Celebrity Summer Season and filled in for the suspended Leon Byner until his return to the airwaves.

He moved back to Sydney between 2001 and 2007, to be with his partner who relocated there to establish a business. He worked in various freelance roles including radio announcer for Radio 2UE, Radio 2GB, ABC NewsRadio and as a senior television reporter with Channel 7 Today Tonight program.

Makin moved back to Adelaide in 2007 to take up the role of senior investigative journalist, reporter and stand-in presenter with Channel 7 Adelaide’s Today Tonight.

In 2013 he took up a six-month contract with Radio 5AA presenting the evening program. He is currently working in a freelance capacity for Channel 7 Adelaide’s Today Tonight filming and presenting stories.

Acting career
Makin has acted in a variety of feature films, plays and television shows, and over the years has been a regular MC for a host of charitable events. He has been involved in the production and hosting of corporate presentations, television commercials and is the voice for Explorer Hop On - Hop Off Sightseeing Tour Buses around Australia. He appeared in episode 578 of Prisoner playing the role of a television host.

Feature films
 The Honourable Wally Norman: Playing the role of bookmaker Alan Unwin. Directed by Ted Emery and opened the 2003 Sydney Film Festival
 Street Hero: Playing the role of a car wash attendant. Directed by Michael Pattinson, Roadshow Films

Television series
 Crawford Productions Zoo Family, Playing the Role of Film Director. Director: Chris Snell
 Crawford Productions Special Squad, Playing the Role of a Drunken Journalist. Director: Howard Rubie
 Crawford Productions The Flying Doctors, Playing the Role of Rodeo Caller. Director: Pino Amenta
 Crawford Productions Special Squad, Playing the Role of Sex Shop Grafter. Director: Arch Nicholson
 Crawford Productions Carson's Law, Playing the Role of Racehourse Trainer Mr Gilbertson. Director: Paul Moloney
 Crawford Productions Carson's Law, Playing the Role of Process Server. Director: Sean Nash
 Crawford Productions Cop Shop, Playing the Role of Real Estate Agent James Wilmott. Director: Robert Meillon
 Grundy Television Prisoner, Playing the Role of a Salesman. Director: Sean Nash
 Grundy Television Prisoner, Playing the Role of Talk Show Host Bob Michaels. Director: Kendal Flanigan

Plays
 WA Productions Mothers And Fathers, Playing the Role of a Policeman. Director: Barrie Barkla
 Space Theatre Adelaide Deadly Nightcap, Playing the Role of Geoffrey Curtis. Director: John Edmund

References

Living people
1947 births
People from Marrickville
Journalists from South Australia